Timothy Thurscross was Archdeacon of Cleveland from 1619 to 1635.

Thurcross was educated at Magdalen College, Oxford.  He became a Canon of York in 1622; Vicar of Kirkby Moorside in 1625; Archdeacon of Cleveland in 1635; and Fellow of Eton College in 1669. He died in the parish of St. Sepulchre's, City of London in November in 1671.

References

17th-century English Anglican priests
Alumni of Magdalen College, Oxford
Archdeacons of Cleveland
Fellows of Eton College
1635 deaths